Ignas Plūkas (born 8 December 1993) is a Lithuanian professional footballer who plays as a goalkeeper for FK Kauno Žalgiris. He played in the UEFA Europa League for FK Trakai five times and has been called up several times for the Lithuania national football team.

References

1993 births
Living people
Association football goalkeepers
Lithuanian footballers
Lithuania international footballers